Vracenky  is a Czech comedy film. It was released in 1990.

External links
 

1990 films
Czechoslovak comedy films
1990 comedy films
Czech comedy films